La Posta is an unincorporated community in La Plata County, in the U.S. state of Colorado.

La Posta is a name derived from Spanish meaning "travelers' rest".

References

Unincorporated communities in La Plata County, Colorado
Unincorporated communities in Colorado